Tallents is a surname. Notable people with the surname include:

Francis Tallents (1619–1708), English Presbyterian clergyman
Stephen Tallents (1884–1958), British civil servant and public relations expert

See also
Tallent (surname)

English-language surnames